Clay C. Christiansen (born June 28, 1958) is a retired Major League Baseball pitcher. He played during one season at the major league level for the New York Yankees. He was drafted by the Yankees in the 15th round of the 1980 amateur draft. Christiansen played his first professional season with their Class-A (Short Season) Oneonta Yankees in 1980, and his last with the Houston Astros' Triple-A Tucson Toros in 1988.

Christiansen graduated from Columbus Unified High School in Columbus, Kansas, in 1976.  In addition to being an American Legion baseball standout, he was the quarterback of the football team, played basketball and participated in track and field.  In his senior year he set a new school record for discus throwing.

After high school, Clay Christiansen attended the University of Kansas in Lawrence, Kansas, where he was a member of the Jayhawks baseball team prior to embarking on his professional career.

Life after baseball
Clay married local Kansas City broadcaster Karen Kornacki as they are still married to this day. Clay currently works for Pepsi in Olathe, Kansas as an install driver for the vending department.

References

1958 births
Living people
New York Yankees players
Major League Baseball pitchers
Baseball players from Wichita, Kansas
Nashville Sounds players
Kansas Jayhawks baseball players
Albany-Colonie Yankees players
Columbus Clippers players
Fort Lauderdale Yankees players
Oneonta Yankees players
Portland Beavers players
Toledo Mud Hens players
Tucson Toros players